This is a list of Ministers of Labour and Social Policies, a senior member of the Italian government who leads the Ministry of Labour and Social Policies. The list shows also the ministers that served under the same office but with other names, in fact this Ministry has changed name many times.

The current Minister is Marina Calderone, and independent, who served since 22 October 2022 in the government of Giorgia Meloni.

List of Ministers

Kingdom of Italy
 Parties

 Coalitions

Italian Republic
 Parties

 Coalitions

Timeline

Kingdom of Italy

Italian Republic

References

Labour